The Terebridae, commonly referred to as auger shells or auger snails, is a group or family of small to large predatory marine gastropods in the superfamily Conoidea.

These gastropods have extremely high spired shells with numerous whorls, and the common name refers to the resemblance of their shells to rock drill-type drill bits.

There are more than 400 known recent species worldwide.

Taxonomy 
This family consists of the following subfamilies (according to the taxonomy of the Gastropoda by Bouchet & Rocroi, 2005):
 Terebrinae Mörch, 1852 - synonyms: Acusidae; Acidae Gray, 1853 (inv.)
 Pellifroniinae Fedosov, Malcolm, Terryn, Gorson, Modica, Holford & Puillandre, 2020 (with de deep-water genera Pellifronia and Bathyterebra)
 Pervicaciinae Rudman, 1969 (with the predominantly Indo-Pacific genera Duplicaria and Partecosta). 

In 2019 there was a comprehensive revision of the taxonomy of the Terebridae by Fedosov, A. E.; Malcolm, G.; Terryn, Y.; Gorson, J.; Modica, M. V.; Holford, M.; Puillandre, N. in the Journal of Molluscan Studies, including the definition of new genera and the redistribution of many species to other genera.

Shell description
The shells of the sea snails in this family are typically shaped like slender augers or screws. In that respect they share certain shell characters with the family Turritellidae, the turret shells.

One characteristic that distinguishes Terebridae from Turritellidae is the short anterior canal or notch in the aperture of the shell. Terebridae shells also tend to have characteristically flattened versus convex whorls, and they often have one or two plaits on the columella.

Numerous species in this family are grouped under the genera Terebra or Hastula, and a minority of species are placed in four other genera.

Life habits
These snails are sand-dwelling carnivores which live in warmer waters. In most species, a venomous barb similar to that of the cone snails, (see Conidae), is used to stun and immobilize prey, which typically consists of various marine worms.

Genera
Genera in the family Terebridae include:
 Bathyterebra Fedosov, Malcolm, Terryn, Gorson, Modica, Holford & Puillandre, 2020
 Cinguloterebra Oyama, 1961
 Clathroterebra Oyama, 1961
 Duplicaria Dall, 1908
 Euterebra Cotton & Godfrey, 1932
 Gemmaterebra Cotton, 1952 
 Gradaterebra Cotton & Godfrey, 1932
 Granuliterebra Oyama, 1961
 Hastula H. Adams & A. Adams, 1853
 Hastulopsis Oyama, 1961
 † Kaweka Marwick, 1931  
 Maculauger Fedosov, Malcolm, Terryn, Gorson, Modica, Holford & Puillandre, 2020
 Microtrypetes Pilsbry & Lowe, 1932
 † Mirula Palmer, 1942 
 Myurella Hinds, 1844
 Myurellopsis Fedosov, Malcolm, Terryn, Gorson, Modica, Holford & Puillandre, 2020
 Neoterebra Fedosov, Malcolm, Terryn, Gorson, Modica, Holford & Puillandre, 2020
 Oxymeris Dall, 1903
 Partecosta Dance & Eames, 1966
 Pellifronia Terryn & Holford, 2008
 Perirhoe Dall, 1908
 Pristiterebra Oyama, 1961
 Profunditerebra Fedosov, Malcolm, Terryn, Gorson, Modica, Holford & Puillandre, 2020
 Punctoterebra Bartsch, 1923
 Strioterebrum Sacco, 1891
 Terebra Bruguière, 1789 -- type taxon
 † Zeacuminia Finlay, 1930

Genera brought into synonymy
 Acus H. Adams & A. Adams, 1853 (synonym of Oxymeris)
 Abretia H. Adams & A. Adams, 1853: synonym of Oxymeris Dall, 1903 (invalid: junior homonym of Abretia Rafinesque, 1814; Abretiella is a replacement name)
 Abretiella Bartsch, 1923: synonym of Oxymeris Dall, 1903
 Acuminia Dall, 1908: synonym of Hastula H. Adams & A. Adams, 1853
 Acus Gray, 1847: synonym of Oxymeris Dall, 1903 (invalid: junior homonym of Acus Lacépède, 1803 [Pisces]; Oxymeris is a replacement name)
 Brevimyurella Oyama, 1961: synonym of Punctoterebra Bartsch, 1923
 Cinguloterebra Oyama, 1961: synonym of Terebra Bruguière, 1789
 Clathroterebra Oyama, 1961: synonym of Myurella Hinds, 1845
 Decorihastula Oyama, 1961: synonym of Myurella Hinds, 1844 
 Dimidacus Iredale, 1929: synonym of Terebra Bruguière, 1789
 Diplomeriza Dall, 1919: synonym of Duplicaria Dall, 1908
 Egentelaria Rehder, 1980: synonym of Hastula H. Adams & A. Adams, 1853
 Euterebra Cotton & Godfrey, 1932: synonym of Duplicaria Dall, 1908
 Gradaterebra Cotton & Godfrey, 1932: synonym of Euterebra Cotton & Godfrey, 1932
 Hastulina Oyama, 1961: synonym of Hastula H. Adams & A. Adams, 1853
 Impages E. A. Smith, 1873: synonym of Hastula H. Adams & A. Adams, 1853
 Laeviacus Oyama, 1961: synonym of Pristiterebra Oyama, 1961
 Myurellina Bartsch, 1923: synonym of Terebra Bruguière, 1789
 Myurellisca Bartsch, 1923: synonym of Duplicaria Dall, 1908
 Noditerebra Cossmann, 1896 †: synonym of Terebra Bruguière, 1789
 Nototerebra Cotton, 1947: synonym of Oxymeris Dall, 1903
 Panaterebra Olsson, 1967: synonym of Terebra Bruguière, 1789
 Paraterebra Woodring, 1928: synonym of Terebra Bruguière, 1789
 Partecosta Dance & Eames, 1966: synonym of Euterebra Cotton & Godfrey, 1932
 Pervicacia Iredale, 1924: synonym of Duplicaria Dall, 1908
 Subula Schumacher, 1817: synonym of Terebra Bruguière, 1789
 Terebrina Bartsch, 1923: synonym of Terebra Bruguière, 1789 (invalid: junior homonym of Terebrina Rafinesque, 1815; Dimidacus is a replacement name)
 Terebrum Montfort, 1810: synonym of Terebra Bruguière, 1789
 Terenolla Iredale, 1929: synonym of Myurella Hinds, 1845
 Triplostephanus Dall, 1908: synonym of Terebra Bruguière, 1789
 Vertagus Link, 1807: synonym of Terebra Bruguière, 1789

References

 Bratcher T. & Cernohorsky W.O. (1987). Living terebras of the world. A monograph of the recent Terebridae of the world. American Malacologists, Melbourne, Florida & Burlington, Massachusetts. 240pp
 Terryn, Y. (2007). Terebridae: A Collectors Guide. Conchbooks & Natural Art. 59pp + plates.

External links

 Gray J.E. (1853). On the division of ctenobranchous gasteropodous Mollusca into larger groups and families. Annals and Magazine of Natural History. ser. 2, 11: 124–132
 Fedosov, A. E.; Malcolm, G.; Terryn, Y.; Gorson, J.; Modica, M. V.; Holford, M.; Puillandre, N. (2020). Phylogenetic classification of the family Terebridae (Neogastropoda: Conoidea). Journal of Molluscan Studies.
 
 Terebridae, Auger Shells
 Terebra dislocata, Atlantic Auger or Eastern Auger
 NC Sea Grant, Seashells of North Carolina Field Guide
 
 Shell Catalogue Family Terebridae and Terebridae Images

Further reading 
 Terryn Y. & Holford M. (2008). "The Terebridae of Vanuatu, with a revision of the * Granuliterebra Oyama, 1961". Visaya Supplement 3 (Malacological Journal of Conchology, Inc., Cebu, Philippines).

External links

 Terebridae at Seashells of New South Wales
 Miocene Gastropods and Biostratigraphy of the Kern River Area, California; United States Geological Survey Professional Paper 642 
 Fedosov, A. E.; Malcolm, G.; Terryn, Y.; Gorson, J.; Modica, M. V.; Holford, M.; Puillandre, N. (2020). Phylogenetic classification of the family Terebridae (Neogastropoda: Conoidea). Journal of Molluscan Studies